is a video game console-only sequel to the 1983 Namco/Midway arcade game Mappy. The game was developed by TOSE and published by Namco in Japan and Taxan in North America for the Nintendo Entertainment System. It was later released by Bandai Namco Entertainment for the Wii U Virtual Console worldwide in February 2015, and on the Nintendo Switch Online Service in March 2022.

Storyline
Mappy must travel through various themed areas, collecting six target items in each one, while attempting to avoid Goro and his gang of Meowkies. The target items differ depending on the story:
 Story 1: It is Mapico's birthday, and the task is to collect cheese as her present.
 Story 2: Mappy wishes to marry Mapico, and must collect wedding rings.
 Story 3: Mappy and Mapico are having a Christmas party, and Christmas trees must be collected.
 Story 4: It is Mappy Jr.'s birthday, and the task is to collect baseballs for his present.

After completing Story 4, it loops back to the first story.

There are eight areas with various unique features, and Goro wears costumes corresponding to each theme:
 Railroad Town
 Western World
 Tropical World
 Jungle World
 Pirate World
 Ghost Town
 Seventh Avenue
 Milky Town

Gameplay
The gameplay is similar to the original Mappy, where the player must collect items and avoid enemies with the assistance of trampolines that will break if jumped on too many times before landing (Jungle World being the one exception to this). Unlike the original, the doors and Microwave Doors are not present, and instead stage specific counterattack items can be used. Mappy can perform a short jump to trigger these items as well as collect the target items; he can also jump over the Meowkies if timed well. In addition, Mappy can carry a number of distraction items (up to 15) to temporarily stop enemies from pursuing:

 Cat Toys - Meowkies will dance around these, and the players can harmlessly pass them by. Goro will not be affected.
 Gold Coin - Goro will dance around this and not harm Mappy. Meowkies will not be affected.
 Silver Vine Pots - Meowkies will lose consciousness. Goro will not be affected.
 Fish - This will bounce forward in the direction Mappy's face. Both Goro and the Meowkies will chase it.

In the Ghost Town, Mappy will use a flashlight to ward off the ghosts, and can travel the stage with a balloon.

In order to finish a stage, the player must collect all six target items and then proceed to the exit on the right. Sometimes in certain stories is necessary to locate a subarea to obtain a special item before exiting. If takes too long to finish an area, a warning chime will sound and the music will speed up, and eventually a Goro Coin will chase Mappy as well, which cannot be attacked or distracted.

 In the Ghost Town, sometimes the subarea where the player must enter is reminiscent of the original Mappy game, complete with its theme music playing. However, there is only a doorway that leads to the next area, while all others warp the player to a different doorway instead.

Once reaching the last area (Milky Town) and collecting all the items, they must enter the castle and play an extra area; the six target items within must be collected and brought to Mapico or Mappy Jr. before the music ends. Failing to do this, the players must retry the extra area until they are successful. When successful, bonus points are awarded and the game starts the next story in the first area. Later stories alter the stage layouts and the enemies become much faster.

In some areas a bonus subarea can be found. These bonus subareas can reward with additional distraction items and extra lives. In order to access these, Mappy must be carrying no distraction items and must jump on a particular trampoline without any controller input; if successful, Mappy will then be sent upwards to the bonus subarea.

Legacy
Mappy-Land is one of the games included in the compilation Namco Museum Archives Vol. 2.

References

1986 video games
Mappy
Namco games
Nintendo Entertainment System games
Nintendo Switch Online games
Platform games
Tose (company) games
Video games about mice and rats
Video games about police officers
Video games developed in Japan
Virtual Console games
Virtual Console games for Wii U